Dicheniotes erosa is a species of tephritid or fruit flies in the genus Dicheniotes of the family Tephritidae.

Distribution
Congo, Uganda, Kenya, Tanzania.

References

Tephritinae
Insects described in 1924
Taxa named by Mario Bezzi
Diptera of Africa